NGC 7006 (also known as Caldwell 42) is a globular cluster  in the constellation Delphinus. NGC 7006 resides in the outskirts of the Milky Way. It is about 135,000  light-years away, five times the distance between the Sun and the centre of the galaxy, and it is part of the galactic halo. This roughly spherical region of the Milky Way is made up of dark matter, gas and sparsely distributed stellar clusters.

NGC 7006 appears in the science fiction novel Beyond the Farthest Star by Edgar Rice Burroughs, where it is used as a point of reference by the inhabitants of the planet Poloda to determine the approximate location of Earth.

Gallery

References

External links
 
 

Globular clusters
Delphinus (constellation)
7006
042b